Turaki B is a ward in Jalingo Local Government Area of Taraba state, Nigeria.

References 

Taraba State
Local Government Areas in Taraba State